The Black Tulip is a historical novel and a work of Romantic poetry written by Alexandre Dumas, père, and first published in 1850.

Story

It begins with a historic event of 1672, the lynching of the Dutch Grand Pensionary Johan de Witt and his brother Cornelis, considered rebels against the stadtholder William III.

During these events there was tulip mania across the Netherlands. In this scenario, the main fictional character Cornelius Van Baerle, belonged to the natural school, whose motto was: "To despise flowers is to offend God", and thus followed the syllogism:

 	"To despise flowers is to offend God,
 	The more beautiful the flower is, the more does one offend God in despising it,
 	The tulip is the most beautiful of all flowers,
 	Therefore, he who despises the tulip offends God beyond measure". (p. 46, The Black Tulip)

The city of Haarlem had set the prize of 100,000 Francs to whoever could grow a black tulip. At stake was not only the prize, but fame and honour. Also, the gardener would perpetuate his name in history by the tulip's recorded name.

The prosperous Cornelius Van Baerle, godson of Cornelius de Witt, starts the liking of growing tulips in his state. Then he takes the challenge of growing the black tulip. But as an act of misfortune, his neighbour, Isaac Boxtel – also a gardener – watches his every move, and fearing his success, starts plotting. Followed by unsuccessful schemings, Boxtel moved by envy, denounces Van Baerle to Justice, because of Van Baerle's relation to the brothers De Witt, traitors of the nation then.

Van Baerle is suddenly arrested, and condemned to a life sentence in prison. Dumas uses religious beliefs for dramatic effect, and words as "Fate", "Providence" and "Misfortune". Misfortune plays a major influence throughout Van Baerle's life events, but at the end succumbs to be a major act of Providence, showing that God is always in control, both in sadness as in happiness.

Was in such an act, that Van Baerle meets the beautiful daughter of the jailer, Rosa Gryphus. Cornelius loses everything but had kept the bulbs of the tulips, that were expected to be black. In midst of loss and sorrows, Rosa helps him to grow the flower in the jail. His growing affection for Rosa gives courage to not give up his fancies and expectations. Rosa is seen as a brave and virtuous girl, not held by her father vices, but strong in her own pursuits.

The drama elucidates how far an envious person can go; how the righteous ones are not forgotten by God; how in the midst of misfortune a greater happiness is right ahead, and so love and flowers can grow within stone walls.

As famously phrased in To Althea: From Prison by Richard Lovelace, "Stone walls do not a prison make, nor iron bars a cage". Van Baerle was free, even inside a prison he was faithful to his conscience. The guards could keep his hands, but not love from him moving forward. And the latter played a major role to prove his innocence.

The philosophy of the book is summed up: "Sometimes one has suffered so much that he has the right never to be able to say, ‘I am too happy.’" (p. 204 The Black Tulip).

The novel was originally published in three volumes in 1850 as La Tulipe Noire by Baudry (Paris). A similarity of story may be seen in The Count of Monte Cristo by same author.

Characters
 William, Prince of Orange, afterward William III, King of England.
 Louis XIV, King of France

 Cornelis de Witt, inspector of dikes at the Hague
 Johan de Witt, his brother, Grand Pensionary of Holland
 Colonel van Deeken, aide-de-camp to William of Orange
 Dr. Cornelius van Baerle, a tulip-fancier, godson of Cornelius de Witt
 Mynheer Isaac Boxtel, his rival
 Marquis de Louvois
 Count Tilly, captain of the cavalry of The Hague
 Mynheer Bowelt, deputy
 Mynheer d'Asperen, deputy
 The Recorder of the States
 Master van Spenser, a magistrate at Dort
 Tyckalaer, a surgeon at The Hague
 Gerard Dow
 Mynheer van Systens, burgomaster of Haarlem and president of its Horticultural Society
 Craeke, a confidential servant of John de Witt
 Gryphus, a jailer, Rosa's father
 Rosa, his daughter, in love with Cornelius van Baerle

Reception

George Saintsbury described the novel as "charming in parts", but felt that Dumas had spun the story out to "an unconscionable length".

Adaptations 
The first screen adaptation appears to have been a silent 1921 Dutch-UK co-production directed by Maurits Binger and Frank Richardson. Alex Bryce directed a well-regarded UK adaptation of the novel in 1937, with Patrick Waddington as Cornelus Van Baerle.  A five-part BBC miniseries debuted in August 1956 with Douglas Wilmer in the lead role.  A second British miniseries appeared in September 1970.  In 1988, Australia's Burbank production company created a 50-minute children's animated film from a bowdlerised version of the story.

A musical adaptation was written in 2004 by Kit Goldstein, and premiered at Union College in February 2005.

See also

Assassinations in fiction
Tulip mania

References

External links 
 
The Black Tulip full text at Google Books
 
 eLook Literature: The Black Tulip - HTML version broken down chapter by chapter.
 Webpage for The Black Tulip musical at kitgoldstein.com.
 

1850 French novels
Fiction set in 1672
Novels by Alexandre Dumas
Historical novels
Novels set in the 1670s
Novels set in the Dutch Golden Age
French novels adapted into plays
Cultural depictions of William III of England
Cultural depictions of Louis XIV
French novels adapted into films
Novels set in prison